Milnesium antarcticum is a species of Eutardigrades in the family Milnesiidae. This species differs from its cogenerate species mainly by proportions of its claws and buccopharyngeal apparatus.

References

Further reading
Smykla, Jerzy, et al. "Diversity and distribution of tardigrades in soils of Edmonson Point (Northern Victoria Land, continental Antarctica)." Czech Polar Rep 2 (2012): 61-70.
Sands, Chester J., et al. "Phylum Tardigrada: an “individual” approach."Cladistics 24.6 (2008): 861-871.

Apochela
Animals described in 2006